Tongde County is a county of Qinghai province, China. It is under the administration of Hainan Tibetan Autonomous Prefecture.

Geography
Tongde County has an alpine subarctic climate (Köppen Dwc), with long, very cold and dry winters, and short, rainy, mild summers. Average low temperatures are below freezing from mid/late September to mid May; however, due to the wide diurnal temperature variation (at an average ), only January has an average high that is below freezing. Despite frequent rain during summer, when a majority of days sees rain, no month has less than 50% of possible sunshine; with monthly percent possible sunshine ranging from 51% in June to 81% in November, the county seat receives 2,806 hours of bright sunshine annually.

See also
 List of administrative divisions of Qinghai

References

 
County-level divisions of Qinghai
Hainan Tibetan Autonomous Prefecture